Meloria is a rocky skerry, surrounded by a shoal, off the Tuscan coast, in the Ligurian sea,  north-west of Livorno.

Meloria shoal
The Meloria shoal is an attractive archaeological, naturalistic and historical region that makes part, since 2010, of the Area Marina Protetta Secche della Meloria (Meloria shoal Marine Protected Area) assigned to the Parco naturale di Migliarino, San Rossore, Massaciuccoli (Natural Park of Migliarino, San Rossore, Massaciuccoli) for the management. The shoal is formed by a rocky bank surrounded by swallow water sandy and muddy of the surface of 9,372 hectare extending up to 12 km offshore. The seabed varies from 2 meters to 30 meters and the habitat is an alternating of rocky areas with characteristic basins seabed with prairies of Posidonia. The sea flora consists mainly of Posidonia and Caulerpa racemosa while the fauna has a rich variety as: Symphodus roissali, Serranus cabrilla, Scorpaena scrofa, Muraena helena, Coris julis, Aphia minuta, Pelagia noctiluca and others. 

Geologically the Meloria consists of a calcareous sandstone bench corresponding to an active undersea fault called Rift of Meloria which caused numerous local earthquakes up to 3,5 in the Richter magnitude scale.

Meloria Tower

The Pisans built in 1157 on a surfacing rock of the Meloria shoal a lighthouse in order to avoid the wrecking of the ships directed to Porto Pisano. It was decided to keep a navigational light giving the task to the Augustinians monks of the hermitage of San Jacopo in Acquaviva by Livorno signing a written agreement for the work.

The tower was destroyed by the Genoese. A second tower was built in 1598 on order of Ferdinando I de' Medici, Grand Duke of Tuscany, which in its turn was destroyed by the bad weather.
The current tower was built in 1709 by Cosimo III de' Medici and has a characteristic form; it is formed by four quadrangular pillars connected by Gothic arches above which arise the tower 15 meters high. The tower was built on the pillars to allow the flow of the waves but had no signalling light. On the south side of the tower is the Latin inscription: “Pro navigntium securitate ad latentes copulo evitandos” (For the sailors safety  pay attention to the reef). In 1986 the tower underwent to a complete renovation.

Meloria lighthouses

Meloria Naval battles

First Battle of Meloria
The first Battle of Meloria, on May 3, 1241, was fought between the fleet of the emperor Frederick II, surnamed Stupor Mundi, in alliance with Pisa, against a Genoese squadron and ended with a Pisan and Imperial victory.

Second Battle of Meloria
The second battle, fought on Sunday August 6, 1284, was of higher historical importance. Usually, Battle of Meloria refers to this battle. It was a typical medieval sea-fight, and accomplished the ruin of Pisa as a naval power, in favour of Genoa.

Meloria air crash
On 9 November 1971, a Royal Air Force Lockheed Hercules C.1 crashed into the sea off the coast of Livorno on the Meloria shoal, killing all 46 passengers and 6 crew.  At the time it was described by Italian officials as the worst military air disaster in Italy in peacetime.

See also
 Battle of Meloria
 Tuscan Archipelago

References

External links

Area Marina Protetta Secche della Meloria Official website 

Islands of Tuscany
Livorno